Red Vermillion is a township in Nemaha County, Kansas, in the United States.

History
The origin of name Red Vermillion is unclear, and 'red vermillion' is somewhat redundant, as vermilion is a shade of red.

References

Townships in Nemaha County, Kansas
Townships in Kansas